Shui Tin Tsuen is a village in Wang Chau, Yuen Long District, Hong Kong.

Administration
Shui Tin Tsuen is a recognized village under the New Territories Small House Policy. It is one of the 37 villages represented within the Ping Shan Rural Committee. For electoral purposes, Shui Tin Tsuen is part of the Ping Shan Central constituency, which is currently represented by Felix Cheung Chi-yeung.

References

External links

 Delineation of area of existing village Shui Tin Tsuen (Ping Shan) for election of resident representative (2019 to 2022)

Villages in Yuen Long District, Hong Kong
Wang Chau (Yuen Long)